Musica Britannica is a trust founded in 1951, as "an authoritative national collection of British music". One of its co-founders, Anthony Lewis, served as the publication's first chief editor for many years.

A programme about the project, with musical examples, was broadcast on BBC Radio 3 on 9 July 2011 beginning at 1.00pm, as The Early Music Show.

External links
Musica Britannica

1951 establishments in the United Kingdom
Music organisations based in the United Kingdom